Sathakam is a Telugu literary piece of art. The name derives from Sata, which means a hundred in Sanskrit. Sathakam usually comprises a hundred poems (give or take). Hence, a Sathakam is a volume (book) of hundred poems.It is one of the most important forms of poetry in Telugu Literature.

Since the creation of Satakams have been around for centuries, they were passed down by transcribers of the bygone eras. Sometime some of the poems are lost to time. At other times the transcribers insert new ones mistakenly or deliberately. However, by doing a comparative study of the same literary work from multiple branches scholars establish which parts are authentic and original.

Purpose of Sathakam 

Satakams are usually devotional, philosophical or convey morals. Some sathakams such as the Sumathi Satakam are popular because of their simplicity and their usefulness in conveying morals which can be taught to school aged children.

Structure and Composition 

Satakams are written in various well known literary scales. While some scales are very old and derive from the Vedic age (called Vedic scales), some are particular to some regions and languages.

Some Examples 

 Andhra Nayaka Satakam by Kasula Purushottama Kavi
Dasarathi Satakam by Kancherla Gopanna (Ramadasu) 
Subhashita Trisati (three sets of hundred) by Bhatruthahari
 Vrushadhipa Satakam by Paalkuriki Somanna 
 Vyaja Ninda by Kasula Purushottama Kavi
 Hamsaladeevi Gopala Satakam by Kasula Purushottama Kavi
 Manasa bodha Satakam by Kasula Purushottama Kavi
 Bhakta Kalpadruma Satakam by Kasula Purushottama Kavi
 Sumathi Satakam by Baddena Bhupaludu

References

External links

Indian poetry collections